Invizimals: The Alliance is an augmented reality video game for the PlayStation Vita and is part of the Invizimals children-oriented franchise. It features cross-play multiplayer interactivity with the PlayStation 3 title Invizimals: The Lost Kingdom. It was released on October 30, 2013, in Europe simultaneously with Invizimals: The Lost Kingdom.

The game was first announced in 2013 alongside Invizimals: The Lost Kingdom. The game expands on the gameplay of the original 2009 Invizimals for the PlayStation Portable. Playstation used Invizimals: The Alliance along with the game Tearaway in marketing videos to showcase the Playstation Vita's hardware capabilities.

Gameplay involves locating and capturing creatures called Invizimals who have escaped into the real world, and integrates the Vita's hardware, including the touch controls, camera, and microphone, into the gameplay. After catching the Invizimals, the player then uses them to battle in tournaments against other Invizimals. The game utilizes Augmented reality via the Vita's camera pointed at AR cards placed on a flat surface to show the Invizimal monters. The game features numerous cutscenes with actors including Brian Blessed.

In addition to crossplay with the PS3 game The Lost Kingdom, the game also interacts with Invizimals animated series by unlocking content when the player scans stickers shown on the show.

The game has a score of 69 on Metacritic and has a Entertainment Software Rating Board (ESRB) rating of Everyone 10+.

References

External links

2013 video games
Augmented reality games
PlayStation Vita games
PlayStation Vita-only games
Sony Interactive Entertainment games
Video games developed in Spain
Multiplayer and single-player video games
Invizimals
Novarama games